USS Gemini (PHM-6) was the final ship of her class of hydrofoils operated by the U.S. Navy. She was named for the constellation.

Pegasus class vessels were designed for high speed and mobility, and carried an armament powerful for its size, consisting of Harpoon anti-ship missiles and a 76 mm cannon.

USS Gemini was converted into a yacht after decommissioning, but was later sold for scrap.

See also 
 List of patrol vessels of the United States Navy

References

 

Pegasus-class hydrofoils
Patrol vessels of the United States Navy
Ships built in Renton, Washington
1982 ships